NK Kamen Ingrad was a Croatian football club from Velika, a small town near Požega in the northeast of Croatia. The club was dissolved in July 2008 after serious financial problems.

History
The club was formed as NK Velika in 1929. After World War II the club was renamed to NK Papuk.

The current name was adopted in 1999, when the club's main sponsor became a local construction company called Kamen Ingrad. Since then the club advanced significantly, having been promoted to Prva HNL in 2002 and entering the UEFA Cup in 2003, losing to Schalke 1–0 on aggregate in the first round.

Kamen Ingrad got relegated in the 2006–07 season after winning only 11 points in 33 matches and ending in 12th place. Originally they won 13 points, but after playing with two ineligible players in two matches, HNS punished them by deducting two points.

Various financial difficulties, caused by the problems in the primary club sponsor Kamen Ingrad, reflected on the club's performance, and it was relegated further down to the Treća HNL in 2008. On 23 July 2008, it was announced that the club's first team will not take part in any competitions during the 2008–09 season, making the club's future after that uncertain. Eventually it became obvious that Kamen Ingrad ceased operations entirely. New club NK Papuk was formed out of the ashes of Kamen Ingrad, but legally it is a distinct and separate club, and is not entitled to claim the history of the Kamen Ingrad.

Honours
Croatian Second Level (1): 2000–01
Croatian Third Level – Division North (1): 1999–2000

Seasons

Key
 League: P = Matches played; W = Matches won; D = Matches drawn; L = Matches lost; F = Goals for; A = Goals against; Pts = Points won; Pos = Final position;
 Cup / Europe: DNQ = Did not qualify; R1 = First round; R2 = Second round; QF = Quarter-final; SF = Semi-final; RU = Runner-up; W = Competition won

European record

Summary

Source: uefa.com, Last updated on 7 September 2022Pld = Matches played; W = Matches won; D = Matches drawn; L = Matches lost; GF = Goals for; GA = Goals against. Defunct competitions indicated in italics.

Record by season

Note: Kamen Ingrad score always listed first.

Managers
 Tonko Vukušić (1999–00)
 Tomislav Radić (2001)
 Rajko Magić (2002)
 Vjeran Simunić (2002)
 Milan Tomljenović (2002–03)
 Nenad Gračan (2003–04)
 Hrvoje Braović (2004–05)
 Ivica Matković (2005–06)
 Ante Čačić (2006)
 Milan Tomljenović (2006)
 Stjepan Čordaš (2007)
 Dalibor Bognar (2007–08)

References

 
Kamen Ingrad
Kamen Ingrad
Kamen Ingrad
Association football clubs established in 1929
Association football clubs disestablished in 2008
1929 establishments in Croatia
2008 disestablishments in Croatia